The Chief of the Defence Staff is the professional head of the Armed Forces of the Republic of Ivory Coast. The Chief of the Defence Staff is appointed by the President of Ivory Coast, who is the commander-in-chief of the Armed Forces according to the Constitution.

The current Chief of the Defence Staff is Army corps general , since 28 December 2018.

List of chiefs of the defence staff

Notes

See also 
 Armed Forces of the Republic of Ivory Coast

References 

Chief of the Defence Staff
Ivory Coast
Chief of the Defence Staff